Bertin Ollé Ollé (born 30 November 1961) is a retired Cameroonian football midfielder. Capped for Cameroon in 1987 and 1988, he played in the victorious  1988 Africa Cup of Nations Final. He was formerly a squad member at the 1981 FIFA World Youth Championship.

References

1961 births
Living people
Cameroonian footballers
Cameroon youth international footballers
Cameroon international footballers
1988 African Cup of Nations players
Africa Cup of Nations-winning players
Tonnerre Yaoundé players
Racing Club Bafoussam players
Association football midfielders